Courtney Elizabeth Thomas, (born October 30, 1988) is an American beauty pageant titleholder from the village of Sigel in Eldred Township Pennsylvania who was named Miss Pennsylvania 2010.

Biography
Thomas won the title of Miss Pennsylvania on June 19, 2010, when she received her crown from outgoing titleholder Shannon Doyle. Thomas's platform is “Don't C.O.P.P. Out! Consequences Of Peer Pressure." Shortly before her 15th birthday, Thomas was severely injured as a passenger in a car accident caused by a drunk driver in which she broke both of her arms and legs. According to Thomas, her story “about rising above the Consequences Of Peer Pressure encourages youth as well as adults to take inventory of their lives and to think about every decision they make so that a bad decision won't end their life prematurely, or have a negative impact on their life.” Thomas is a senior biological sciences major at Drexel University. She hopes to become a physician with her own family practice.

References

External links
 
 

Miss America 2011 delegates
1988 births
Living people
Drexel University alumni
People from Philadelphia
American beauty pageant winners